Emsworth & District Motor Services, sometimes known as Emsworth and District Bus Company, was a bus operator based near the Hampshire and West Sussex border close to Emsworth in the United Kingdom.

Established in 1977, it ceased in 2018 trading after its operating licence was revoked. At the time operations ceased, it operated 18 vehicles. Portsmouth City Coaches took on some staff, vehicles, and the Southbourne depot.

References

External links

Official website

Transport companies established in 1977
Transport companies disestablished in 2018
1977 establishments in England
2018 disestablishments in England
Former bus operators in West Sussex